Martim Moniz is a station on the Green Line of the Lisbon Metro. The station is located in the Martim Moniz Square.

History
The station was designed by the architect Denis Gomes with art installations by the painter Maria Keil.

Connections

Urban buses

Carris 
 12E Praça da Figueira - circulação
 28E Martim Moniz ⇄ Campo de Ourique (Prazeres)
 208 Cais do Sodré ⇄ Estação Oriente (Interface) (morning service)
 708 Martim Moniz ⇄ Parque das Nações Norte
 734 Martim Moniz ⇄ Santa Apolónia
 760 Gomes Freire ⇄ Cemitério da Ajuda

Aerobus 
 Linha 1 Aeroporto ⇄ Cais do Sodré

See also
 List of Lisbon metro stations

References

External links

Green Line (Lisbon Metro) stations
Railway stations opened in 1966
1966 establishments in Portugal